The 1880 Columbia football team represented Columbia University in the 1880 college football season.

Schedule

References

Columbia
Columbia Lions football seasons
Columbia Football